Nancy Goodman Brinker (born December 6, 1946) is the founder of The Promise Fund and Susan G. Komen for the Cure. Brinker was also United States Ambassador to Hungary from 2001 to 2003 and Chief of Protocol of the United States from 2007 to the end of the George W. Bush administration. In 2011, she was appointed to be a Goodwill Ambassador for Cancer Control by the World Health Organization.For her work on breast cancer research, Time magazine named Brinker to its 2008 list of the 100 most influential people in the world. Brinker was awarded the Presidential Medal of Freedom by Barack Obama on August 12, 2009.

Early life
Brinker (née Goodman) was born in Peoria, Illinois to the Jewish family of Marvin L. and Eleanor (née Newman) Goodman. Her father was a commercial real-estate developer and her mother was a housewife. In 1968, she received a bachelor's degree from the University of Illinois. After graduating, she moved to Dallas, Texas and worked at Neiman Marcus as an assistant couture buyer. In the following years she took various positions at other public relation firms before marrying businessman Norman Brinker.

Career

Susan G. Komen 
Brinker served as founding chairman of Susan G. Komen for the Cure, supervising all aspects of initial growth. The organization was named after Brinkman's sister, who died of breast cancer. On December 2, 2009, Brinker was appointed CEO, a position which she held until June 17, 2013, when Judith A. Salerno succeeded her.

World Health Organization Goodwill Ambassador
Brinker is currently serving as the World Health Organization's Goodwill Ambassador for Cancer Control. She was appointed by WHO Director-General Margaret Chan on May 26, 2009. She advocated for strengthening global action for cancer prevention and control in the context of the Global Strategy for the Prevention and Control of Noncommunicable Diseases endorsed by the World Health Assembly in May 2008. Her message emphasized the need for low and middle-income countries to strengthen comprehensive and evidence-based cancer control policies and programs.

Chief of Protocol

On October 7, 2008, Brinker hosted a symposium on "Breast Cancer Global Awareness" at the Blair House. First Lady Laura Bush joined the participants and the White House was illuminated in pink for the occasion.

As Chief of Protocol, Brinker expanded the role of the office through outreach programs intended to foster better relationships with the Diplomatic Corps. The effort, known as Diplomatic Partnerships involved over 60 events, including "Experience America", where the Diplomatic Corps traveled throughout the United States to meet with business and civic leaders.

Ambassador to Hungary
Brinker served as United States Ambassador to Hungary from September 2001 to 2003. For the first time, she held a conference on the trafficking and exploitation of workers that health ministers from the neighboring Balkan States attended. She also raised awareness about breast cancer among Hungarian women by leading a march over the Chain Bridge in Budapest. The bridge was illuminated in pink for the occasion.

Hungarian President Ferenc Mádl decorated Brinker with the Order of Merit, Medium Class, Cross Adorned with Star, for her work in advancing bilateral relations and in recognition of her charity activities.

The Promise Fund
The Promise Fund of Florida was created by Ambassador Nancy G. Brinker, Julie Fisher Cummings and Laurie Silvers in 2018. It was set up to address a lack of preventative diagnosis of breast cancer among women in South Florida.

Other government service
In 1986, President Ronald Reagan appointed her to the National Cancer Advisory Board and in 1990, President George H.W. Bush appointed her to chair the President's Cancer Panel and monitor the progress of the National Cancer Program. In 1992, Vice President Dan Quayle invited her to chair a subcommittee monitoring research, progress and development in the fight against breast cancer.

Brinker was a bundler for George W. Bush when he was running for office, helping to organize and collect campaign contributions from other donors. In 2000, she became a Pioneer, a member of his $100,000 Club. And on December 24, 2008, President Bush appointed her to the board of trustees of the John F. Kennedy Center for the Performing Arts for a six-year term.

She testified before the United States Democratic Policy Committee's Congressional Breast Cancer Forum and participated in the International Women's Forum.

Awards
Brinker has received the following awards and titles:
 1995 University of Illinois Alumni Achievement Award
 The 1997 S. Roger Horchow Award for Greatest Public Service by a Private Citizen, awarded by Jefferson Awards
 The 2000 Cino del Duca Award, the James Ewing Layman Award from the Society of Surgical Oncology
 2004 Service to America Leadership Award presented by the National Association of Broadcasters Educational Foundation
 2005 Mary Woodard Lasker Public Service Award in Support of Medical Research
 The American Society of Breast Disease 2006
 2007 Trumpet Award
 2007 Castle Connolly National Health Leadership Award
 2007 Pro Cultura Hungarica Medal
 American Association for Cancer Research Centennial Medal for Distinguished Public Service in 2007
 2007 IARC Medal of Honour
 Modern Healthcare 2007 Health Care Hall of Fame
 2009 Porter Prize
 Presidential Medal of Freedom, awarded by President Barack Obama on August 12, 2009
 Reader's Digest Trust Poll: The 100 Most Trusted People in America, May 2013
 Inducted as a Laureate of The Lincoln Academy of Illinois and awarded the Order of Lincoln (the State's highest honor) by the Governor of Illinois in 2016 in the area of Social Services.
 National Women's Hall of Fame
 Texas Women's Hall of Fame
 Time magazine, 100 Most Influential People in the World
 Ladies' Home Journal's 100 Most Important Women of the 20th Century
 Biography Magazine's The 25 Most Powerful Women in America
 Anti-Defamation League Americanism Award
 The Ladies' Home Journal's Top 10 Champions of Women's Health
 Global Pathfinder Award
 The Champions of Excellence Award presented by the Centers for Disease Control
 ASCO Special Recognition Award
 Cancer Research and Treatment Fund, Inc. Cancer Survivors Hall of Fame
 The Sword of Ignatius Loyola Award from Saint Louis University
 The Albert Einstein's Sarnoff Volunteer Award
 The Champion of Prevention Award by the National Foundation for the Centers for Disease Control
 Inducted into the Cancer Research and Treatment Fund, Inc. Cancer Survivors Hall of Fame

Publications
Brinker has co-authored four books:
 Promise Me: How a Sister's Love Launched the Global Movement to End Breast Cancer , co-authored with Joni Rodgers - September 14, 2010
 The Race is Run One Step at a Time, co-authored with Catherine McEvilly Harris
 1000 Questions About Women's Health, co-authored with Dr. H. Jane Chihal
 Winning the Race: Taking Charge of Breast Cancer, co-authored with Chriss Anne Winston

Brinker wrote the forewords for:
 Tamoxifen for the Treatment and Prevention of Breast Cancer by V. Craig Jordan
 Tamoxifen: A Guide for Clinicians and Patients by V. Craig Jordan

Personal
Nancy Goodman's first husband was Robert M. Leitstein, an executive at Neiman Marcus. They had one son together but divorced in 1978.

On February 13, 1981, Nancy Goodman married Norman E. Brinker, founder of Brinker International, which provided access to capital and influence and enabled her role in public service.  Norman Brinker provided funds and methodology for building the Komen foundation. The couple were major contributors to George W. Bush's first presidential campaign. They divorced shortly after the 2000 U.S. Presidential election, but Norman Brinker remained a board member of Komen for the Cure, having served on its board since its founding in 1982 until his death in 2009.

While ambassador, Brinker began to collect Hungarian art. Her collection spans 100 years, from just before the Austro-Hungarian Empire to the present and has been on display at several museums around the United States. The collection is one of the largest outside of Hungary.

Brinker is a major funder of gay marriage initiatives. She serves on the advisory board of the Harvey Milk Foundation.

References

External links

 Nancy G. Brinker website

Papers of Nancy Brinker, 1954-2019 Schlesinger Library, Radcliffe Institute, Harvard University.

1946 births
Living people
American businesspeople in retailing
American health activists
American LGBT rights activists
20th-century American Jews
American women ambassadors
Ambassadors of the United States
People from Peoria, Illinois
Ambassadors of the United States to Hungary
University of Illinois Urbana-Champaign alumni
Presidential Medal of Freedom recipients
Illinois Republicans
Texas Republicans
Chiefs of Protocol of the United States
Newsmax TV people
21st-century American Jews